PRTC may stand for:

 PEPSU Road Transport Corporation, a bus operator in Punjabi, India
 Potomac and Rappahannock Transportation Commission, a public bus service in Prince William County, Virginia
 Puducherry Road Transport Corporation, a Puducherry government public bus-service company 
 Puerto Rico Telephone Company, a Puerto Rican telecommunication company; now América Móvil
 Revolutionary Party of Central American Workers (a political party in Central America
 Revolutionary Party of Central American Workers – El Salvador (1980–1995), a left-wing political party in El Salvador